Jack Kiefer may refer to:

 Jack Kiefer (golfer)
 Jack Kiefer (statistician)